Arsène Lupin contra Sherlock Holmes is a 1910 German drama film serial directed by Viggo Larsen. The survival status of any of the episodes is unknown.

Cast
 Viggo Larsen as Sherlock Holmes
 Paul Otto as Arsène Lupin

List of episodes
 "Der Alte Sekretar" (The Old Secretary) also known as “Arsene Lupin”, released 20 August 1910
 "Der Blaue Diamant" (The Blue Diamond), released 17 September 1910
 "Die Falschen Rembrandts" (The Fake Rembrandts) also known as “The Two Rembrandts”, released 7 October 1910
 "Die Flucht" (The Escape), released 24 December 1910
 "Arsene Lupins Ende" (The End of Arsene Lupin), released 4 March 1911

See also
 List of film serials
 List of film serials by studio

References

External links

1910 films
1910 drama films
German drama films
German black-and-white films
Sherlock Holmes films
Films of the German Empire
German silent short films
German crossover films
Film serials
Arsène Lupin films
Silent drama films
Silent adventure films
Silent mystery films
Silent thriller films
1910s German films